Lucy R. Wyatt is a British mathematician and a Professor in the School of Mathematics and Statistics at the University of Sheffield, Yorkshire, UK.  Wyatt is a member of the Environmental Dynamics research group in the School of Mathematics.

Education 

Wyatt obtained a BSc in mathematics from the University of Manchester,
UK, in 1972.  In 1973 she was awarded an M.Sc. in fluid mechanics from the University of Bristol,
UK and in 1976 she obtained her PhD in physical oceanography from the University of Southampton,
UK.

In 1981 she began working on the oceanographic applications of HF radar as a research assistant at the University of Birmingham, UK and in 1987 she joined the Department of Applied Mathematics, the University of Sheffield, UK.  Wyatt's research interests include high-frequency radar oceanography and ocean surface waves.  She has been an associate editor of the IEEE Journal of Oceanic Engineering.

Publications 
 Limits to the Inversion of HF Radar Backscatter for Ocean Wave Measurement
 HF radar data quality requirements for wave measurement
 Radio frequency interference cancellation for sea-state remote sensing by high-frequency radar
 HF Radar data availability and measurement accuracy in Liverpool Bay before and after the construction of Rhyl-Flats wind farm

External grants 

 The measurement of the directional wavenumber frequency spectrum with HF radar (NERC)
 Applications of computational geometry to the analysis of directional ocean wave spectra measured by HF radar (EPSRC)
 A non-linear inversion for HF radar wave measurement (OCE 62) (EPSRC)
 OSCR antenna beam measurement (NERC)

References

External links 

 

Living people
21st-century English mathematicians
British oceanographers
Academics of the University of Sheffield
Alumni of the University of Manchester
Alumni of the University of Bristol
Alumni of the University of Southampton
21st-century women mathematicians
Year of birth missing (living people)